The A343 highway is a highway in Nigeria. It is one of the east–west roads that links to the main south–north roads. (It is named for the two highways that it links).

Route
The A343 highway runs from the A3 highway in Enugu, the capital of Enugu State — to the A4 highway at Emandak, Cross River State.

It passes through Abakaliki, the capital of Ebonyi State.

References

Highways in Nigeria
Enugu
Enugu State
Cross River State
Ebonyi State